Methyldopamine may refer to:

 α-Methyldopamine
 Deoxyepinephrine (N-methyldopamine)
 3-Methoxytyramine (3-O-methyldopamine)
 4-Methoxytyramine (4-O-methyldopamine)